The 1967 Carolina 500 was a NASCAR Grand National Series event that was held on June 18, 1967, at North Carolina Motor Speedway in Rockingham, North Carolina.

The transition to purpose-built racecars began in the early 1960s and occurred gradually over that decade.  Changes made to the sport by the late 1960s brought an end to the "strictly stock" vehicles of the 1950s.

Background
North Carolina Motor Speedway was opened as a flat, one-mile oval on October 31, 1965. In 1969, the track was extensively reconfigured to a high-banked, D-shaped oval just over one mile in length. In 1997, North Carolina Motor Speedway merged with Penske Motorsports, and was renamed North Carolina Speedway. Shortly thereafter, the infield was reconfigured, and competition on the infield road course, mostly by the SCCA, was discontinued. Currently, the track is home to the Fast Track High Performance Driving School,

Race report
The 500-lap race took four hours and forty-six minutes in front of 22,000 spectators. Nine cautions were given for 45 laps. Ten of the most notable crew chiefs of the late 1960s would make their appearance here; including Dale Inman, Harry Hyde and Glen Wood. Richard Petty recorded his first Rockingham victory by defeating Buddy Baker.

This win would push Petty onto the top of the NASCAR standings for the first time in his career.

Petty's winning dynasty would eventually expand to 200 career race wins and multiple championship wins. Richard Petty scored his 11th win of an eventual 27 wins on a title-winning 1967 NASCAR Grand National Series season. Most of the manufacturers in this race were either Chevrolet or Ford; with a few other brands as the minority on the racing grid. Buddy Baker was the favorite to win the race and was a dominant force on the track alongside Richard Petty and Cale Yarborough. However, a slow pit stop forced Baker to accept second place, one lap behind the winner. Engine problems and crashes were the primary reasons that drivers didn't finish the race.

All of the 44 drivers on the racing grid were born in the United States of America. J.T. Putney would receive the last-place finish of the race due to a crash on lap 2. Johnny Allen and Gary Sain would retire from NASCAR after the end of this race.

Qualifying

Finishing order

* denotes that the driver failed to finish the race.

References

Carolina 500
Carolina 500
NASCAR races at Rockingham Speedway